Irai Island is the main island of the Conflict Islands, which were sighted in 1879 by HMS Cormorant and named in 1880 by Bower, captain of HMS Conflict.

References

Atolls of Papua New Guinea
Islands of Milne Bay Province
Louisiade Archipelago